Chkhikvadze ( or ) is a surname of Georgian origin.  Notable people with this name include:

 Irakli Chkhikvadze (b. 1987), Georgian rugby player
 Keti Chkhikvadze, Georgian fashion designer
  (1883-1920), Georgian poet
  (1903-1940), Soviet and Georgian writer
 Ramaz Chkhikvadze (1928-2011), Georgian actor
  (b. 1947), Georgian writer
  (1911-2006), Russian jurist
  (b. 1950), former Russian ambassador to Chile
  (b. 1940), Soviet herpetologist and paleontologist

Surnames of Georgian origin
Chkhikvadze